Linda Manz (August 20, 1961 – August 14, 2020) was an American actress. She made her feature film debut at age 15 in Terrence Malick's acclaimed period drama Days of Heaven (1978), playing an adolescent girl growing up in rural Texas in 1916. She followed this with a supporting role in The Wanderers (1979). Manz earned critical acclaim for her portrayal of a troubled teenage girl from a dysfunctional family in Dennis Hopper's controversial drama film Out of the Blue (1980).

Manz stepped away from her acting profession in the mid-1980s and relocated to Southern California, where she lived outside the public eye and focused on raising her three children. She returned to acting in 1997 with small roles in Harmony Korine's experimental drama film Gummo and David Fincher's thriller The Game.

Early life
Linda Manz was born in New York City to Sophie E. Manz, and never knew her father.
Growing up in Upper Manhattan, Manz had a troubled childhood and a difficult relationship with her mother which led to her running away from home frequently and attending several schools.  Manz told People magazine in 1979: “For a long time, I was always asking people to adopt me”. She was initially indifferent to acting but, as she later explained in 2011, it was her mother, a cleaner at the World Trade Center, who encouraged her to seek a career as an actress. Her mother insisted that Manz attend a performing arts academy that taught acting and dancing.

Career
While at an academy for show business, a teacher told her that the casting director Barbara L. Claman was looking for streetwise kids to appear in a new Hollywood film. Manz turned up unannounced at Claman’s office, “smoking and looking all of 10 years old” but according to Claman “she had that special quality we wanted.” This introduction eventually led in 1976 to Manz being selected at the age of 15 by Terrence Malick to act in his second film, Days of Heaven, as a streetwise orphan who joins her older brother and his lover when they flee Chicago in 1916, and find work, then refuge, with a wealthy Texas farmer. The film was released in 1978 due to its lengthy editing. Manz's part was initially smaller, but Malick was so impressed by her that he made a last-minute decision to have her provide an unscripted, improvised narration. Manz told interviewers, years later, that,  “I just watched the movie and rambled on,” and that, “They took whatever dialogue they liked.” She received excellent reviews, with critic Roger Ebert saying, “Her voice sounds utterly authentic; it seems beyond performance.”

Manz appeared alongside Ken Wahl in the 1979 teenage-gang drama The Wanderers, directed by Philip Kaufman, 
Her next role was in the short-lived CBS series, Dorothy.
Manz then had a spot in the 1979 television movie Orphan Train as Sarah, as one of many orphans relocated from eastern orphanages to farms in the West and Midwest in the late 1800s/early 1900s.

She then made an impression as the lead in Dennis Hopper's influential cult film Out of the Blue (1980). In Hopper’s drama she played Cebe, a troubled Elvis-obsessed teenager who masks her vulnerability with a punk attitude. Over a  CB radio she broadcasts statements such as “Kill all hippies!” and “Subvert normality!” Her voice was subsequently sampled by Primal Scream in their song "Kill All Hippies", which was released in 2000.

In 1981, she starred opposite Leif Garrett and Ralph Seymour in the television film Longshot, which focused on a group of teenaged foosball enthusiasts. In 1985, Manz appeared in a small role as a robber in "The Snow Queen", an episode of Faerie Tale Theatre.

By the mid-1980s, she had disappeared from the industry which Manz insisted was not due to any dramatic walking-out-on-Hollywood story, telling Time Out in 1997: “There was a whole bunch of new young actors out there, and I was kind of getting lost in the shuffle, so I laid back and had three kids. Now I enjoy just staying home and cooking soup.” 
The director Harmony Korine, who admired her work, sought out Manz after a 16-year absence from the screen for the role of a fast-talking tap-dancing mother of one of the main characters in Gummo, his nihilistic portrayal of marginalized small-town life which was released in 1997.

Manz then followed this with a small role as the roommate of Deborah Kara Unger's character Christine in David Fincher's thriller film The Game (1997).

Personal life
Manz married film-industry camera operator Bobby L. Guthrie in 1985. Together they had three children: Michael, Christopher (who died in 2018) and William. She spent her later life in Antelope Valley, California.

Manz died in Palmdale, California on August 14, 2020, aged 58, of complications from pneumonia and lung cancer.

Filmography

Film

Television
 1979 Dorothy as Frankie (4 episodes; "The Bookworm Turns", "Hard Hearted Hamlet", "Lies and Whisper", "Give My Regrets to Broadway")
 1979 Orphan Train as Sarah
 1985 Faerie Tale Theatre as Robber Girl ("The Snow Queen")
 2009 This Beat Goes On: Canadian Pop Music in the 1970s as Herself, documentary

References

External links

1961 births
2020 deaths
American film actresses
20th-century American actresses
Actresses from New York City
Deaths from pneumonia in California
Deaths from lung cancer in California
21st-century American women